Contrazt is a Norwegian dance band from Solør, formed in 2004. The group originated when Hanne Mette Gunnarsrud and Leif Dybendal from the duo Fullt og helt decided to expand and change the name. Three new guys joined when the group Contrazt occurred.

Contrazt's first album,  was released in 2006. After five years on the road and three albums Gunnarsrud decided to stop to prioritize family.

Gro Anita Johansen took over as lead singer. The band's fifth album, 2010's , went gold in four weeks. In 2011, the album  won Contrazt the 2011 award as Folk, Golden Boot. In 2012, the group released their eighth album, . Contrazt was named Folk, Gullskoen 2012. Contrazt were selected to perform at the final of Melodi Grand Prix 2015 on 14 March, with their song "Heaven".

Albums

References

Dansbands
1982 establishments in Sweden
Musical groups established in 1982